The Komoka Kings are a Canadian junior ice hockey team based in Komoka, Ontario, Canada.  They play in the Western division of the Greater Ontario Junior Hockey League.

History

In 1968, the Petrolia Jets joined the Border Cities Junior "B" league.  Although not much is known about the league prior to '68, it is thought that the team originated in the "Bluewater Junior "C" Hockey League" by OHA historians.  When the BCJCHL became the Great Lakes Junior C Hockey League in 1970, the Jets stayed on board.  In 1972, the Jets moved up to Western Junior "B", but were sent back to Junior "C" in 1984.  In 1989, the Jets came back to the Western "B".

The Petrolia Jets moved to Forest, Ontario in 2008.  Their name was changed to the Lambton Shores Predators, to match the name of the local minor hockey system.

During the summer of 2017, the Predators relocated and became the Komoka Kings and now play out of the Komoka Wellness Centre.
The Kings first regular season home game in Komoka was against the Sarnia Legionnaires and ended in a 3-3 2OT tie.  Captain Andrew Kim scored 2 goals and Isaac McLean added 1.

2022–23 Ownership / Staff
Owner / General Manager - Roop Chanderdat
Assistant General Manager / Director of Hockey Operations - Ray Giffen
Director of Player Personnel - Don Dickson
Head Coach - Adam Casey
Assistant Coach - Inch Rahaman
Assistant Coach - Currently Vacant
Goalie Coach - Dave MacDonald
Trainer - Doug White
Equipment Manager - Darryl Bond

Season-by-season results

References

External links
Komoka Kings Webpage

Western Junior B Hockey League teams